Silin is a Russian masculine surname, its feminine counterpart is Silina. It may refer to
 Vyacheslav Ivanovich Silin, Russian firearms designer.
 Egor Silin, Russian cyclist.
 Marie Silin (born 1979), French politician

 Tīna Siliņa (born 1995), Latvian curler
 Yelena Silina (b. 1987), Russian ice hockey player.

Russian-language surnames